The 1954 North Carolina Tar Heels football team represented the University of North Carolina at Chapel Hill during the 1954 college football season. The Tar Heels were led by second-year head coach George T. Barclay, and played their home games at Kenan Memorial Stadium. The team competed as a member of the Atlantic Coast Conference, in the conference's second season of football, finishing in third.

Schedule

References

North Carolina
North Carolina Tar Heels football seasons
North Carolina Tar Heels football